Viracocha (in hispanicized spelling) or Wiraqucha (Quechua, the name of a god) was the eighth Sapa Inca of the Kingdom of Cusco (beginning around 1410) and the third of the Hanan dynasty.

He was not the son of Yawar Waqaq; however, it was presented as such because he belonged to the same dynasty as his predecessor: the Hanan. His wife's name was Mama Runtucaya, and their sons included Inca Rocca, Tupac Yupanqui, Pachacuti and Ccapac Yupanqui. His original name was Hatun Tupaq Inca, but was named Viracocha after seeing visions of the god in Urcos.  With Ccuri-chulpa, he had two additional sons, Inca Urco and Inca Socso.
 
Events in Viracocha Inka's life have been recorded by several Spanish writers. The source closest to the original indigenous accounts comes from Juan de Betanzos, a Spanish commoner who rose to prominence by marrying an Inka princess and becoming the foremost translator for the colonial government of Cusco. Traditional oral histories of the Inka have been recorded by the Spanish Jesuit Bernabe Cobo. According to these accounts, including a widely recognized sixteenth century chronology written by Miguel Cabello Balboa, Viracocha Inka was a "warlike" and "valiant" prince. As a young man, Viracocha declared that after he took the throne "he would conquer half the world".
 
However, in 1438 when, according to Cobo, the Chanka offensive took place, 
Viracocha was advised to leave Cusco before the Chanca attack.  He left for Caquia Xaquixahuana, taking his illegitimate sons, Inca Urco and Inca Socso. However, his third son, Cusi Inca Yupanqui (later famous as the Emperor Pachacuti) refused to abandon Cuzco and the House of the Sun. He remained with his brother Inca Rocca and six other chiefs, who together defeated the Chancas. The spoils were offered to Inca Viracocha to tread on, but he refused, stating Inca Urco should do so, as his successor.  Inca Rocca later killed his brother Urco, and Inca Viracocha died of grief in Caquia Xaquixahuana.

One chronicler, Sarmiento de Gamboa, states that Viracocha was the first Incan to rule the territories he conquered, while his predecessors merely raided and looted them.  His captains, Apu Mayta and Vicaquirau, subdued the area within 8 leagues of Cuzco.

References

Bibliography 
 
 
 

Inca emperors
15th-century deaths
Year of birth unknown
15th-century monarchs in South America